SZ DJI Technology Co., Ltd. or Shenzhen DJI Sciences and Technologies Ltd. or DJI is a Chinese technology company headquartered in Shenzhen, Guangdong, backed by several state-owned entities. DJI manufactures commercial unmanned aerial vehicles (drones) for aerial photography and videography. It also designs and manufactures camera gimbals, action cameras, camera stabilizers, flight platforms, propulsion systems and flight control systems.

DJI accounts for around 76% of the world's consumer drone market as of March 2021. Its camera drone technology is widely used in the music, television and film industries. The company's products have also been used by militaries and police forces, as well as terrorist groups, with the company taking steps to limit access to the latter. 

US government institutions have prohibited the internal use of DJI products, but as of 2020, various agencies at the local and federal level continued to use DJI products. In December 2021, the United States Department of the Treasury prohibited investment in DJI by U.S. individuals and entities, accusing the company of complicity in aiding the Uyghur genocide. Their drones have also been widely used in the Russian invasion of Ukraine.

History 

The company was founded in 2006 by Frank Wang (Wāng Tāo). Born in Hangzhou, Zhejiang, he enrolled as a college student in the Hong Kong University of Science and Technology (HKUST) in 2003. He was part of the HKUST team participating in ABU Robocon and won third prize.

Wang built the first prototypes of DJI's projects in his dorm room, selling the flight control components to universities and Chinese electric companies. He used the proceeds to move to the industrial hub of Shenzhen  and hired a small staff in 2006. The company struggled at first with a high degree of churn among employees attributed to Wang's abrasive personality and perfectionist expectations. The company sold a modest number of components during this period, relying on financial support from Wang's family friend, Lu Di, who provided US$90,000 and managed the company's finances. In 2009, DJI's components enabled a team to successfully pilot a drone around the peak of Mt. Everest.

In 2010, Wang hired a high school friend, Swift Xie Jia, to run the company's marketing. DJI began to cater more to drone hobbyists in markets outside of China. In 2011, Wang met Colin Guinn at a trade show, and the two of them founded DJI North America, a subsidiary company focusing on mass market drone sales. In 2013, DJI released the first model of the Phantom drone, an entry-level drone which was more user-friendly than other drones on the market at the time.

The Phantom was commercially successful but led to conflict between Guinn and Wang. Midway through the year, Wang made an offer to buy out Guinn, which was refused. By the end of the year, DJI had locked employees of the North American subsidiary out of their email accounts in the process shutting down the subsidiary's operations. Guinn sued DJI, with the case being settled out of court.

In 2015, DJI eclipsed the success of the Phantom with the Phantom 3, whose even greater popularity was in part due to the addition of a built in live-streaming camera. DJI was now the largest consumer drone company in the world, driving many of its competitors out of the market. 2015 also marked the beginning of DJI's RoboMaster Robotics Competition, an annual international collegiate robot combat tournament held at the Shenzhen Bay Sports Centre.

In November 2015, DJI announced the establishment of a strategic partnership with Hasselblad. In January 2019, DJI acquired a majority stake in Hasselblad.

In 2017, DJI won a Technology and Engineering Emmy Award for its camera drone technology, which was used in the filming of various television shows including The Amazing Race, American Ninja Warrior, Better Call Saul and Game of Thrones. That same year, Wang became Asia's youngest tech billionaire, and world's first drone billionaire.

Also in 2017, signed a strategic cooperation agreement to provide surveillance drones for use by the Chinese police in Xinjiang.

On 5 June 2018, police body cam and Taser maker Axon announced a partnership with DJI to sell surveillance drones to U.S. police departments. As of 2020, DJI products are also widely used by U.S. police and fire departments.

On 21 January 2019, DJI announced that an internal probe had uncovered "extensive" fraud by some employees who "inflated the costs of parts and materials for certain products for personal financial gain." DJI estimated the cost of the fraud at "up to CN¥1 billion" (US$147 million), but maintained that the company "did not incur a full year loss in 2018."

In January 2020, the United States Department of the Interior announced that it would be grounding around 800 drones which it had been using for wildlife conservation and infrastructure monitoring purposes. By March 2020, DJI retained 77% of the US market share for consumer drones with no other company holding more than 4%.

In 2020, DJI drones are being used by many countries around the world to combat the Coronavirus. In China, DJI drones are used by the police force to remind people to wear masks. In other countries, such as Morocco and Saudi Arabia, their drones are used to disinfect urban areas and monitor human temperatures in order to contain the spread of Coronavirus.

Corporate structure 
In 2018, DJI raised roughly $1 billion in funds in preparation for an envisioned IPO at the Hong Kong Stock Exchange. As of July 2020, these rumors persisted with no indication that an IPO is forthcoming. The company had previously raised $500 million in a 2015 funding round from investors including state-owned New China Life Insurance, GIC, and New Horizon Capital, the latter being co-founded by the son of China's former premier minister Wen Jiabao.

DJI has also received investment from Shanghai Venture Capital Co., SDIC Unity Capital, owned by the State Development & Investment Corporation, and the China Chengtong Holdings Group, owned by the State-owned Assets Supervision and Administration Commission of the State Council.

DJI counts roughly 14,000 employees and has 17 offices internationally. The company is known for having a very difficult hiring process, as well as an extremely competitive internal culture, where teams are often pitted against each other to design better products.

DJI's factories in Shenzhen include highly sophisticated automated assembly lines. Many of the components for these assembly lines are built in-house.

Products

Flight systems

Controllers 
DJI develops flight controllers intended for multi-rotor stabilization control of various platforms or heavy payloads in aerial photography. Their most prominent controller, the A2 controller, includes orientation, landing, and home return features. Some of their products include GPS-compass receivers, LED indicators and Bluetooth connectivity.

Modules

Camera drones

Flame Wheel 
The Flame Wheel (风火轮) series are multirotor platforms for aerial photography. As of 2016, there is the hexacopter F550, and quadcopters F330 and F450. The most recent is the ARF KIT.

Phantom 

The Phantom (精灵) series has evolved to integrated flight programming with a camera, Wi-Fi or Lightbridge connectivity, and the pilot's mobile device. Phantoms are made for aerial cinematography and photography applications, but are also used in recreational use.

There have now been four generations of the product line, the most recent one is the Phantom 4 RTK, announced on October 15, 2018.

Spark 

Released in May 2017, the Spark (晓) features a 12-megapixel camera stabilized mechanically by a 2-axis gimbal. The Spark also carries an advanced infrared 3D camera that helps the drone to detect obstacles in front of it, as well as facilitating hand-gesture control. In addition to a smartphone app with virtual controller, a physical controller can also be bought.

There have been multiple complaints that the drone switches off and fall while flying. DJI responded to this by releasing a mandatory battery firmware update in August 2017.

Mavic 

The Mavic (御) series currently includes Mavic Pro, Mavic Pro Platinum, Mavic Air, Mavic Air 2, DJI Air 2S, Mavic 2 Pro, Mavic 2 Zoom, Mavic 2 Enterprise, Mavic 2 Enterprise Advanced, Mavic 3, Mavic 3 Cine, Mavic Mini, DJI Mini SE, and DJI Mini 2 and Dji Mini 3 Pro. The release of the Mavic Air 2 was not without controversy, however, as DJI announced that a key safety feature, AirSense (ADS-B), would not be available on models outside the US. Shortages on components and complexities of production owing to the ongoing COVID-19 crisis at the time were blamed.

Starting with the Mini 2, the Mavic name was dropped from most of the new models such as the Air 2S and the Mini SE.

DJI released the Air 2S on April 15, 2021.

The DJI Mavic 3 and the Mavic 3 Cine was released on November 4, 2021, at 10PM EDT. The Mavic 3 superseded the Mavic 2 Pro and the Mavic 2 Zoom and was priced for prosumers and professionals more than hobbyists. The Mavic 3 Enterprise and Mavic 3 Thermal were released on September 27, 2022, and superseded Phantom 4 RTK and Mavic 2 Enterprise Advanced drones in surveying, inspection, safety, and rescue tasks.

Inspire 

The Inspire series is a professional series of camera quadcopters similar to the Phantom line, but with an aluminum-magnesium body with carbon fibre arms, as well as detachable props on the Inspire 2. It was presented in 2017.

Inspire specifications:

FPV 
On March 2, 2021, DJI announced the launch of the DJI FPV, an entirely new type of hybrid drone combining the first-person view (FPV) and high-speed performance of racing drones, the cinematic camera and reliability of traditional consumer drones, and an optional innovative motion controller that allows pilots to control the drone with just single-handed movements. The new FPV system lets pilots see from the drone's perspective in low-latency high-definition video thanks to "O3", the third iteration of DJI's proprietary OcuSync technology. It allows pilots to capture ultra-smooth and stable 4K video at 60 fps with the stabilization of RockSteady electronic image stabilization.

Industrial UAV

Spreading Wings 

The Spreading Wings (筋斗云) series are mainly industrial UAVs for professional aerial photography, high definition 3D mapping, ultra-light search and rescue, and surveillance etc. based on camera gear on board. In 2013, two models were released: S800 regular and EVO.

Matrice 

The Matrice (经纬) series is designed for industrial applications, including surveying, inspection, search and rescue and firefighting.

The Matrice 100 is a fully programmable and customizable drone, launched on July 6, 2015. It has expansion bay and communication ports, which allows developers to add additional components for different purposes.

Agras 
Agras is DJI's agricultural drone series with a takeoff weight of 2580kg. These drones are used for spraying crops. Agras models have environmental protection and have IP67 rating for core parts and IP54 rating for batteries.

Stabilized cameras

Ronin 

The Ronin (如影) is a standalone ground-based camera platform developed for cinematography and aerial filmmaking in professional environments. It is built for professional videography and photography and targets the film industry. By using three individual motors, Ronin stabilizes when moving vigorously. Later models of the Ronin include the Ronin-M, Ronin 2, Ronin-S, Ronin-SC, and the Ronin 4D.

Osmo 

The Osmo (灵眸) is a camcorder developed by DJI. The camera uses a smartphone to view camera footage and can record 4K and take either 12–16 MP stills. Later models include the Osmo Pocket and the Osmo Action.

The Osmo mobile relies on the user's smartphone as the camera. Most smartphones are accepted into the gimbal with a width range of 2.31–3.34 inch (58.684.8 mm). The original Osmo Mobile has reached its end-of-life and has been replaced with a second generation, called Mobile Osmo 2. Osmo Mobile 3 was announced in August  2019, and is designed for the social media crowd.

Goggles 

The DJI FPV series are head-mounted displays designed for FPV drone flying.  There are two different product lines in the FPV series, the DJI Goggles (DJI) and the Digital FPV System (FPV). The DJI Goggles are designed to interface with DJI-branded drones, using dual LC display screens, wireless connectivity and direct photo and video capture control. In November 2017, DJI also released DJI Goggles RE ("Racing Edition"), which featured compatibility with racing quadcopters. The DJI Digital FPV System is a standalone system designed for non-DJI brand or custom-built drones.

Educational robots

RoboMaster S1 

On 11 June 2019, DJI unveiled the RoboMaster S1 ( S1), its first consumer ground drone, named after DJI's annual RoboMaster robot combat competition, of which it is now an unofficial mascot.  The S1 is a tank-like rover remotely controlled in first-person view via Wi-Fi and an app on Microsoft Windows, Apple iOS or Google Android mobile devices. Designed to be an "advanced educational robot", the user has to assemble the S1 out of the box from loose parts and learn to program its AI functionality.  Both Scratch and Python are programming languages employed by DJI along with app learning modules to teach the end user how to code.

RoboMaster EP 
The DJI RoboMaster EP ( EP) was officially released on March 9, 2020, although it was first teased in a YouTube RoboMaster S1 commercial on November 25, 2019.

The EP supports more than 20 third-party sensors and open-source hardware such as Micro Bit, Arduino and Raspberry Pi.

Controversies

Privacy and security concerns in the U.S. 
The United States Department of the Interior's Office of Aviation Services said in their analysis in July 2017 that DJI's software did not meet requirements "to decline and lock out any device information sharing including telemetry through aircraft, software or applications preventing any automated uploads or downloads."  As response DJI published the offline mode that allows its drones to fly without transferring data over the internet.

The Register reported in August 2017 that the DJI GO app contained JSPatch framework which allowed DJI to hot-patch the app without triggering a review by Apple, or without first seeking user consent. This was against Apple's rules and 45,000 apps were blocked from the App Store because of "hot patching concerns". In August the United States Army also changed its internal guidance on disallowing the use of DJI products, especially in battlefield scenarios. Guidance was based on an Army Research Laboratory report from May 2017 which found cyber-vulnerabilities. The US Army's decision launched public research where it was speculated that the decision was because the data link between the controller and the drone was vulnerable.

As a result, DJI released a bug bounty program for finding flaws. Security researcher Kevin Finisterre reported a security breach of private customer data at DJI to the bug bounty program. In the breach, developers had pushed the private keys for SSL, Cloud storage and firmware AES keys to a GitHub repository. As per Finisterre's description in Ars Technica, he was able to access flight log data and images uploaded by DJI customers, including photos of government IDs, drivers licenses, and passports. Some of the data included flight logs from accounts associated with government and military domains. However, the after the long discussion with DJI's legal team, he decided to turn down the $30,000 bounty and publish the information.

In 2018, in response to the allegations of mishandling user data, DJI commissioned Kivu Consulting to make larger analysis. Kivu found that only DJI GO 4 app was connected to the Internet, it worked without Internet connection and only uploaded data after user confirmation. It also used servers which were located in the US except the crash reporting app called Bugly which uploaded crash reports to the server located in China.

In January 2020, the United States Department of the Interior announced that it would be grounding around 800 DJI drones over security concerns, which it had been using for wildlife conservation and infrastructure monitoring purposes.

In a May 2020 report analyzing the data use of DJI's Mimo app, which is used to control the Osmo gimbles from a smartphone, security research company River Loop Security made several discoveries "of concern" for users and policy-makers. According to the researchers, the social media app sends a variety of data, including sensitive personal information, through insecure means to servers located in China without user consent, raising suspicions that personal user data could be freely accessible to the Chinese authorities. User information was also sent to third-party servers, "where the Terms of Use Agreement supports cooperation with the Chinese Government."

In July 2020, the reports by Synacktiv and GRIMM on the security of the DJI GO 4 mobile app found that it collected user information (IMSI, IMEI, the serial number of the SIM card) from phones and was able to force the installation of updates. The app also prompted the user to grant permission to "Install Unknown Apps" for installing update from DJI site. The app also integrated to social media site Weibo's SDK similar way and allowed to install Weibo related third-party apps also. Synacktiv wrote "Given the wide permissions required by DJI GO 4—contacts, microphone, camera, location, storage, change network connectivity—the DJI or Weibo Chinese servers have almost full control over the user's phone."

DJI responded that "system detects if a DJI app is not the official version – for example, if it has been modified to remove critical flight safety features like geofencing or altitude restrictions – we notify the user and require them to download the most recent official version of the app from our website. In future versions, users will also be able to download the official version from Google Play if it is available in their country" In the statement release DJI said that to use Weibo SDK user's need proactively turn it on. DJI also responded that “DJI GO 4 is not able to restart itself without input from the user, and we are investigating why these researchers claim (that it will stay running after it is closed)”.  In August 2020, Synacktiv alleged that DJI's Pilot app shares many of the same issues present in DJI GO 4, which DJI denied.

A 2020 analysis by Booz Allen Hamilton reported that they did not find evidence of unauthorized data transfers to China. The apps used the backend servers located in US. The only exception was the crash analytics which connected to Chinese servers.

In November 2020, senators Chris Coons, Rick Scott, and others criticized a decision by the United States Air Force to purchase DJI drones on security grounds.

U.S. sanctions 

In December 2020, the United States Department of Commerce added DJI to the Bureau of Industry and Security's Entity List. In January 2021, then President Trump signed an executive order mandating the removal of Chinese-made drones from U.S. government fleets. In December 2021, the United States Department of the Treasury prohibited investment in DJI by U.S. individuals and entities, accusing the company of assisting the People's Liberation Army and complicity in aiding the Uyghur genocide. In October 2022, the United States Department of Defense added DJI to a list of "Chinese military companies" operating in the U.S.

Pentagon analysis 
In May 2021, United States Department of Defense issued an analysis on DJI products. The unclassified portion of the report concluded that two types of drone in the DJI "Government Edition" line-up shows "no malicious code or intent and are recommended for use by government entities and forces working with US services." This is according to a summary obtained by The Hill though the Defense Department did not respond to an inquiry asking for elaboration.

Incidents involving DJI products 
In January 2015, a Phantom 3 drone crashed into the White House's south lawn, in Washington, D.C., US. DJI later set up a no-fly Geo-system according to prohibited airspace, and forced all drones to update the firmware. The system introduced will prevent flights from getting closer to, or take off in restricted zones, based on GPS location.

A DJI Phantom 2 drone carrying radioactive material was landed on the Prime Minister's Official Residence in Tokyo, Japan—the 2015 Tokyo drone incident. Subsequently, the National Diet passed a law restricting drone flights near government buildings and nuclear sites.

In 2016, ISIS used DJI drones as exploding devices in Iraq. DJI later created a broad no-fly zone over nearly all of Iraq and Syria. That year, a DJI drone was nearly involved in a midair collision with a Chinese fighter jet. The Chinese government subsequently insisted that DJI develop an air traffic registry to track its drones within China.

On 30 March 2018, Israel Defense Forces used DJI's Matrice 600 drone to drop tear gas from above.

On 4 August 2018, two Matrice 600 drones detonated explosives near Avenida Bolívar, Caracas in an apparent attempt to assassinate Venezuelan president Nicolás Maduro.

2022 Russian invasion of Ukraine 
DJI drones have been used by both Ukraine and Russia during the 2022 Russian invasion of Ukraine. It served as the preferred tactical surveillance, strike, and propaganda by Ukraine's armed forces. According to the investigation by Faine Greenwood of the Foreign Policy, DJI drones are sourced by governments, hobbyists, international donations to Ukraine and Russia to support each side on the battlefield, and were often flew by drone hobbyists recruited by the armed forces. The prevalence of DJI drones was attributable to their market dominance, affordability, high performance, and reliability.

Ukraine has used DJI drones extensively after being invaded, while battlefield footage suggests their usage by Russia as well. After German retailer Media Markt stopped selling DJI drones, DJI said that its products were for civilian use and inappropriate for the military. Following criticism of the company's operation in Russia, DJI suspended its business in both Russia and Ukraine to prevent its products from being used in combat.

Ukrainian troops have used DJI drones to conduct reconnaissance and direct strikes on Russian forces. Ukrainian troops have also used modified DJI drones to drop improvised explosives on opposing forces. Fitted with high-definition cameras, Ukrainian also used the DJI drones to produce effective propaganda materials, including live war footage of Russian forces and heavy equipment being destroyed.

A Ukrainian soldier told CNN that Russian forces were able to use the drones' AeroScope function to track Ukrainian operators. Ukrainian Vice Prime Minister Mykhailo Fedorov said that without no-fly zones imposed by DJI, its drones were being used by Russia against Ukrainian forces and that Russian forces were able to track Ukrainian drones using the AeroScope detection platform. DJI replied to him on Twitter saying that its drones are designed for civilians and that requirements such as AeroScope and Remote ID make them inappropriate for military use. DJI can set up geofencing in Ukraine if its government were to make a formal request, but doing so could affect all parties' drones unless individual units are prevented from downloading the geofencing update. The Verge did not find any confirmed reports on Russian AeroScope usage and interviewed a DJI spokesperson to clarify the issue.

See also 

 List of unmanned aerial vehicles of China
 List of Chinese companies

References

External links 
 
 

 
Multinational companies headquartered in China
Manufacturing companies based in Shenzhen
Privately held companies of China
Chinese brands
Action cameras
Camcorders
Video surveillance companies
Unmanned aerial vehicle manufacturers
Unmanned helicopters of China
Multirotor helicopters
Chinese companies established in 2006
Vehicle manufacturing companies established in 2006
Articles containing video clips
Companies based in Shenzhen